Bazman (also Romanized as Bazmān) is a city in and capital of Bazman District, in Iranshahr County, Sistan and Baluchestan Province, Iran. At the 2006 census, its population was 4,002, in 816 families.

References

Populated places in Iranshahr County

Cities in Sistan and Baluchestan Province